Stefan Bosse (born December 24, 1964) is a German politician, representative of the Christian Social Union of Bavaria.

Since 2004 he has been an Oberbürgermeister for the state of Kaufbeuren.

See also
List of Bavarian Christian Social Union politicians

References

Christian Social Union in Bavaria politicians
1964 births
Living people
Place of birth missing (living people)
21st-century German politicians